728 Naval Air Squadron (728 NAS) was a Naval Air Squadron of the Royal Navy's Fleet Air Arm. It was formed in 1943 as a Fleet Requirement Unit, operating from airfields around the Mediterranean before settling for most of its existence in Malta.

History of 728 NAS

Fleet Requirements Unit (1943 - 1967)
728 Naval Air Squadron was formed on 1 May 1943 at RN Air Section North Front,  Gibraltar, as a Fleet Requirements Unit. The squadron was equipped with Defiant TT.1 and Swordfish I. Whilst at Gibraltar it operated detachments at RN Air Section Tafaraoui, Algeria, from 11 May 1943 to 15 June 1943, with Swordfish aircraft and also at RAF Oujda, Morroco, before moving to RNAS Dekheila (HMS Grebe), Alexandria in Egypt, on 15 June 1943.

The squadron was absorbed into 775 NAS on 4 July 1943. However, just over one month later, on the 14 August, 728 NAS reformed at Dekheila. The squadron soon moved to Malta and settled at RNAS Hal Far (HMS Falcon), from 5 May 1946, after brief stints at RN Air Section Takali (HMS Goldfinch) and RAF Luqa and just after taking up radar calibration duties from No. 255 Squadron RAF.

Helicopters were added to supplement the squadron's inventory when it started operating the Westland Dragonfly HR.3 at the end of 1952. 728B Flight was the identity given to the new RNAS Hal Far SAR (Search and Rescue) flight, this operated utilising the Westland Whirlwind HAR.3 which arrived in 1957. In March 1963, Westland Whirlwind HAS.22 became available for the SAR flight, which was then  amalgamated into 728 NAS.

On 31 May 1967 728 Naval Air Squadron disbanded at RNAS Hal Far.

Aircraft flown
The squadron operated a variety of different aircraft and versions:

 Avro Anson I
 Martin Baltimore IV
 Martin Baltimore V
 Bristol Beaufighter II
 Bristol Beaufighter X
 Bristol Beaufighter TT Mark 10
 Bristol Beaufort I
 Boulton Paul Defiant TT.1
 Hawker Hurricane IIc
 Miles Martinet TT.1
 de Havilland Mosquito B.25
 de Havilland Mosquito T.3
 de Havilland Mosquito PR.16
 de Havilland Mosquito TT.39
 Airspeed Oxford I
 Supermarine Seafire L.IIC
 Supermarine Seafire III
 Supermarine Seafire XV
 Supermarine Seafire F.17
 Supermarine Sea Otter 2
 Fairey Swordfish I
 Fairey Swordfish II
 Supermarine Walrus
 Vickers Wellington XIV
 Westland Dragonfly HR.3
 Beech Expediter C.2
 Fairey Gannet T.2
 North American Harvard T.3
 de Havilland Heron C.2
 Gloster Meteor T.7
 Gloster Meteor TT.20
 de Havilland Sea Devon C.20
 de Havilland Sea Hornet FR.20
 de Havilland Sea Vampire F.20
 Short Sturgeon TT.3
 Westland Whirlwind HAR.3
 Westland Whirlwind HAS.22

References

Citations

Bibliography

700 series Fleet Air Arm squadrons
Military units and formations established in 1945
Air squadrons of the Royal Navy in World War II